Seismicity is a measure encompassing earthquake occurrences, mechanisms, and magnitude at a given geographical location. As such, it summarizes a region's seismic activity. The term was coined by Beno Gutenberg and Charles Francis Richter in 1941. Seismicity is studied by geophysicists.

Calculation of seismicity 
Seismicity is quantitatively computed. Generally, the region under study is divided in equally sized areas defined by latitude and longitude, and the Earth's interior is divided into various depth intervals on account of Earth's layering: Up to  depth, and > .

The usual formula to calculate seismicity is:

where 
 : is the energy of a single seismic event (i.e., earthquake);
 : interval of latitude;
 : interval of longitude
 : interval of the hypocenter;
 : interval of the time of the seismic event.
 The result is seismicity as energy per cubic unit.

See also 
 Moment magnitude scale
 Plate tectonics
 Seismology
 Wadati–Benioff zone

References

Seismology measurement
1940s neologisms